Mae Tan Noi railway station is a railway station located in Wiang Tan Subdistrict, Hang Chat District, Lampang. Between Khun Tan and Mae Tan Noi, the railway crosses 3 bridges: Composite, Sam Ho and Song Ho bridges (from Mae Tan Noi respectively), then the Khun Tan Tunnel before arriving at Khun Tan station.

Train services 
 Local 407/408 Nakhon Sawan-Chiang Mai-Nakhon Sawan

References 
 
 

Railway stations in Thailand